Lost in London is a 2017 Nigerian comedy film directed by Sunkanmi Adebayo and produced by Uduak Isong Oguamanam as part of the Okon franchise series. The film stars Ime Bishop Umoh, Alexx Ekubo, Ella Bates, and Khafi Kareem. It was released on 9 June 2017 and premiered on Netflix in 2019.

Plot  
The theme of the film revolves around Okon and Boma who were young students who got selected for an exchange program in London and their attempt to earn some pounds before returning to Nigeria leave them with thrilling experiences and encounter.

Cast 

 Alexx Ekubo as Bonaventure
 Kia Nolan as Angie
 Khafi Kareem as Abimbola (Taxi Driver)
 Peter Coe as Restaurant Manager
 Ella Bates as Christine

References

External links 

 
 

English-language Nigerian films
Nigerian comedy films
2010s English-language films